Meslilloet Mountain is a  summit located in British Columbia, Canada.

Description
It is the highest point in the Coquitlam Ranges, and second-highest point in Pinecone Burke Provincial Park. It is set east of the confluence of Meslilloet Creek and Indian River, with precipitation runoff and glacial meltwater from the mountain draining into Meslilloet and Hixon creeks, which are both tributaries of the Indian River. The glacier on Meslilloet Mountain is the closest glacier to Vancouver. The mountain's toponym was officially adopted December 12, 1939, by the Geographical Names Board of Canada.

Climate
Based on the Köppen climate classification, Meslilloet Mountain is located in the marine west coast climate zone of western North America. Most weather fronts originate in the Pacific Ocean, and travel east toward the Coast Mountains where they are forced upward by the range (Orographic lift), causing them to drop their moisture in the form of rain or snowfall. As a result, the Coast Mountains experience high precipitation, especially during the winter months in the form of snowfall. Winter temperatures can drop below −20 °C with wind chill factors below −30 °C. This climate supports a glacier on the peak's north slope. The months July through September offer the most favorable weather for climbing Meslilloet Mountain.

See also

 Geography of British Columbia
 Geology of British Columbia

References

External links
 Weather: Meslilloet Mountain 

One-thousanders of British Columbia
Pacific Ranges
New Westminster Land District
Coast Mountains